Marija Jelenska (Zagorje, Austria-Hungary, 1842 - Barcelona, Spain 1882) was a Croatian Serbian theatre actress. According to the Small Encyclopedia, Đorđe Maletić's "Materials" and Article B. Stojanović's "Three Great Yugoslav Actresses in the 19th Century", was born in 1852.

Biography 
After graduating from acting school in Vienna, in 1866 Jelenska was engaged in Croatian National Theater in Zagreb, in 1868 she acted in Osijek, and from 1869 to 1871 she was a member of the National Theater in Belgrade, and then performed in Vienna Burgtheater, then in Prague, Hamburg, Graz, and Stuttgart. 

At the opening of the National Theater, on October 30, 1869, in the play "The Posthumous Glory of Prince Mihailo" by Djordje Maletić, famous actors performed: Adam Mandrović, Đordje Peleš, Miloš Cvetić, Toša Jovanović, Milka Grgurova, Marija Jelenska, Julka Jovanović, and others. 

Already in the second season, and the first in the newly built building on the site of the former Stambol kapije, the National Theater performed "Venetian merchant" on 26 November 1869. It is the first Shakespeare of this work to be shown in Belgrade in particular and Serbia in general. The beautiful Marija Jelenska attracted the special attention of the spectators. In addition to the role of Portia in "The Merchant Of Venice", her many very successful creations are remembered, such as Maria Stuart in this play of the same name Schiller, Amalia in the play "Robbers" by the same writer, Judith in Karl Gutzkow's play "Uriel Acosta", Vidosava in the play "Miloš Obilić" by Jovan Subotić and others. Jelenska won over viewers and critics not only with her appearance but also with her inspired emotional engagement in interpreting love roles, but also with the dramatically deepened revival of tragic heroines. 

The newly founded ensemble of the National Theatre in Belgrade was a gathering of the best acting forces: they brought unrest to the capital and brought bohemianism, which would become famous in the eighties. The official prima donnas were: Milka Grgurova, Ljubica Kolarović and Marija Jelenska. Despite the constructed rivalry, Grgurova and Jelenska were friends. Due to numerous intrigues, Jelenska left Belgrade in 1871.

Marija Jelenska in Belgrade 

In February 1869, Jelenska, at the age of 27, was invited from Osijek to the Belgrade National Theater to perform.  At the session of the theater board on 3 March, her letter was read, stating that she would accept guest appearances in six plays. The board determined five imperial ducats for each performance and six ducats in the name of travel expenses. Jelenska appeared in front of our theater audience on 12 April in a short Schneider play "Colonel of 18"; she played the main role (Marquis Julia Kreki) and then performed: on 23 April in Subotić's "Praise" in the main role, the daughter of the prefect of Raška; 4 May Macu in "Border Guards" by Freidenreich; 6 May in Schiller's "Intrigue and Love"; 8 May in "Heroes" by Mersan; 10, 11, and 14 May in Schiller's "Mary Stewart." That piece ended the season.

References 

1842 births
1882 deaths
Austro-Hungarian artists